Fiesta is the eighth studio album by Italian singer Raffaella Carrà, released in 1977 by CGD. The album was named after the song of the same name, which was widely popular in Italy, Spain, Canada and Argentina. The recording was produced by Gianni Boncompagni.

The Italian and Canadian versions of the album have songs in both English and Italian, while the Spanish version has lyrics adapted to the language. In 1977, Raffaella Carra was nominated for the Canadian Disco Awards for this album.

As part of the Fiesta promotion, Carrà went on tour, visiting Argentina, Chile, Peru and Mexico in 1979.

Track listing

Credits
 Raffaella Carrà – vocals
 Shel Shapiro – arrangement
 Paolo Ormi – guitar, piano, percussion, arrangement
 Enzo Restuccia – drums, percussion
 Massimo Bartoletti, Alberto Corvino, Nino Culasso, Ernesto Pumpo – trombone
 Silvestro Catacchio, Giuseppe Gabucci, Camillo Grasso, Milena Costisella, Paolo Mezzaroma, Fernando Baratta – strings
 Rita Mariano, Patrizia Neri, Isabella Sodani – backing vocals

Charts

References

1977 albums
Raffaella Carrà albums
CBS Records albums